H syndrome, also known as Histiocytosis-lymphadenopathy plus syndrome or PHID, is a rare genetic condition caused by mutations in the SLC29A3 gene which encode the human equilibrative nucleoside transporter (hENT3) protein.

It is also known as Faisalabad histiocytosis, familial Rosai-Dorfman disease, sinus histiocytosis with massive lymphadenopathy and pigmented hypertrichosis with insulin-dependent diabetes mellitus syndrome.

Presentation

This syndrome has a number of different clinical features many of which start with the letter 'H' giving rise to the name of the syndrome. These features include
 Hyperpigmentation
 Hypertrichosis
 Hepatosplenomegaly
 Hearing loss
 Heart anomalies
 Hypogonadism
 Low height (short stature)
 Hyperglycemia/diabetes mellitus
 Hallux valgus/flexion contractures

Exophthalmos, malabsorption and renal anomalies have also been reported.

Genetics

The SLC29A3 gene is located on the long arm of chromosome 10 (10q22).The causative gene was identified in 2010.

Pathogenesis

This is not understood at present.

Management

There is no curative treatment for this condition at present. Management is directed to the clinical features.

History

This condition was first described in 1998.

References

External links 

Autosomal recessive disorders
Genetic diseases and disorders
Rare syndromes